Albert Marcus Wiggins Jr. (May 27, 1935 – June 1, 2011) was the first American swimmer to win Amateur Athletic Union (AAU) national championships in three strokes: butterfly, backstroke and freestyle. He set four world records in the 100-meter and 100-yard butterfly, and in total won eight AAU titles. He also participated in the 1956 Summer Olympics and finished seventh in the 100-meter backstroke event. Although he was recognized as a world top medley swimmer, this event became Olympic only in 1964.

Biography
Wiggins was born in Pittsburgh, Pennsylvania, the son of a vice president of Westinghouse Air Brake Company.  He attended Allderdice High School and then Ohio State University, where he trained under the 1952 Olympic coach Mike Peppe. Although he was tall and well-built, Wiggins was shortsighted from a young age and wore glasses; he therefore avoided sports requiring physical contact and chose swimming instead. He started training at a club at age 13. Although he was interested in backstroke, this discipline was then dominated by Yoshi Oyakawa, which led Wiggins to explore other styles.

Wiggins retired from competitions at age 22 to pursue a career in law, and, after graduating from Harvard Law School, returned to Pittsburgh to work at Reed Smith Shaw & McClay. He was married, but divorced in the early 1970s and remarried Hollis Wiggins, a colleague from Reed Smith Shaw & McClay. The couple established a private firm and worked in the field of tax and estate law. Wiggins retired from practicing law in 2001. He continued to swim through most of his life, mostly in his private pool, but avoided masters competitions.

He died in Pittsburgh, aged 76, from a tear in the aorta after a morning swim. He was survived by his wife, sister Marge Hanley, and three children: daughters Susan Wiggins and Rhiana Wiggins from the first marriage, and son David from the second marriage.

Wiggins was inducted into the International Swimming Hall of Fame as an "Honor Swimmer" in 1994.

He appeared on the cover of Sports Illustrated in April 1956 when he was 21 years old.  He is one of 68 athletes to have been featured in the "Faces in the Crowd" section of the magazine and then also appear on a cover.

See also
 List of Harvard Law School alumni
 List of Ohio State University people

References

External links
 
 Albert Wiggins (USA) – Honor Swimmer profile at International Swimming Hall of Fame 

1935 births
2011 deaths
American male backstroke swimmers
American male butterfly swimmers
American male freestyle swimmers
Harvard Law School alumni
Ohio State Buckeyes men's swimmers
Olympic swimmers of the United States
Pennsylvania lawyers
Sportspeople from Pittsburgh
Swimmers at the 1956 Summer Olympics
20th-century American lawyers